Nishapur County (Šahrestâne Neyšhâbur), or officially Romanized as Neyshabur County, is in Razavi Khorasan province, Iran. The capital of the county is Nishapur, the second largest city in the province and the third largest city in Eastern Iran. At the 2006 census, the county's population was 441,184 in 118,214 households. The following census in 2011 counted 433,105 people in 128,969 households, by which time Taghenkoh District and most of Takht-e Jolgeh District had been separated from the county to form Firuzeh County. At the 2016 census, the county's population was 451,780 in 142,545 households. After the census, Zeberkhan District was separated from the county to form Zeberkhan County.

Administrative divisions

The population history and structural changes of Nishapur County's administrative divisions over three consecutive censuses are shown in the following table. The latest census shows four districts, 13 rural districts, and seven cities.

History

Nishapur massacre by the Mongols
The Nishapur massacre by the Mongols took place at Nishapur in April of 1221. The Mongol armies of Genghis Khan massacred the entire population of the area, which some estimates put at 1,747,000 citizens.

References

 

Counties of Razavi Khorasan Province